Jaluit Atoll (Marshallese: , , or) is a large coral atoll of 91 islands in the Pacific Ocean and forms a legislative district of the Ralik Chain of the Marshall Islands. Most of the land area is on the largest islet (motu) of Jaluit (10.4 km2). Jaluit Atoll is a designated conservation area and Ramsar Wetland.

In 2011 the population of the islands of Jaluit Atoll was 1,788. It was the former administrative seat of the Marshall Islands.

History

The British merchant vessel Rolla sighted Jaluit in 1803. She had transported convicts from Britain to New South Wales and was on her way to China to find a cargo to take back to Britain.

In 1884, the German Empire claimed Jaluit Atoll, along with the rest of the Marshall Islands,  and the Germans established a trading outpost. Jaluit became a German protectorate on September 13, 1886, and had several imperial commissars (Kaiserliche Kommissare):

 1886–1888 Dr. jur. Wilhelm Knappe (1855–1910)
 1888–1888 Dr. Franz Leopold Sonnenschein (1857–1897)
 1889–1891 Friedrich Louis Max Biermann	
 1891–1894 Dr. Karl Wilhelm Schmidt (b. 4 March 1859 in Braunschweig)		
 11 May 1894 – March 1898 Georg Irmer (b. 1853 – d. 1931)
 24 March 1898 – 18 January 1906 Eugen Brandeis (b. 1846 – d. 1919) (acting to 22 February 1900)
 18 January 1906 – May 1906 Ludwig Kaiser (acting) (b. 1862 – d. 1906)
 1 April 1906 – 3 October 1914  the governors of German New Guinea; afterwards the jurisdiction was downgraded to district, under a Bezirksamtmann

The island became part of the vast US Naval Base Marshall Islands. After World War I, the island became a part of the South Seas Mandate, a mandated territory of the Empire of Japan, and was the seat of the Japanese administration over the Marshall Islands. Immigrants from Japan numbered several hundred by the 1930s. During World War II the island's Japanese garrison consisted of 1,584 men of the Imperial Japanese Navy and 727 men of the Imperial Japanese Army. The island was bombed on at least five occasions in November and December 1943 by B-24 Liberator bombers of the USAAF 7th Air Force.

Following World War II, Jaluit came under the control of the United States as part of the Trust Territory of the Pacific Islands until the independence of the Marshall Islands in 1986.

Geography
Jaluit Atoll's lagoon is shaped roughly like a kite.

The islet of Jabor has the largest population center on Jaluit Atoll, with a population of approximately 1,200.  The island features a small hotel, small stores that sell staple foods, and a gasoline station. Jabor is a base for commercial and sports fishing, where motorboats can be rented. Snorkeling spots are around the sunken dock by the airport and in the northern pass into the lagoon.

Imiej is an islet a 45-minute boat ride from Jabor. It used to be the headquarters for the Imperial Japanese Navy garrison and was a major seaplane base. The ruins of the power station, barracks, antiaircraft guns and a Shinto shrine remain.

Education
Marshall Islands Public School System operates public schools.

High schools:
 Jaluit High School (JHS) - a boarding school that serves students from Jaluit Atoll and the southern atolls of Ebon, Ailinglaplap, Namu, Kili, Namdrik and Jabat.

Primary schools:
 Imiej Elementary School
 Imroj Elementary School
 Jabnoden Elementary School
 Jabor Elementary School - Jabor
 Jaluit Elementary School
 Mejrirok Elementary School
 Narmej Elementary School

Private schools:
Jabor has St. Josephs, attached to the Catholic Church.

Transportation
Jaluit Airport is served by Air Marshall Islands.

Twin towns
Jaluit is twinned with:
  New Taipei City, Taiwan, since 2019

Notes

References

External links

 Marshall Islands site
 
 Surrender of Jaluit to the United States

 
IUCN Category VI
Ramsar sites in the Marshall Islands
Atolls of the Marshall Islands
Ralik Chain